A Kiss may refer to:

"A Kiss", single by Mario Lanza written Sinatra, Brooks
"A Kiss", Russian art song by Dargomïzhsky

See also
Kiss (disambiguation)